Erin Finn (born November 19, 1994 in West Bloomfield, Michigan) is a female long-distance runner from the United States. She competed in the 2013 IAAF World Cross Country Championships – Junior women's race placing 34th in 20:03.

Prep
Erin Finn won 2011 and 2012 Michigan High School Athletic Association division 1 state Cross country titles for West Bloomfield High School. Finn finished second at 2011 Foot Locker Cross Country Championships. Finn finished seventh at 2010 Foot Locker Cross Country Championships.
Finn is a two-time Gatorade cross country runner of the year in Michigan. Erin held the national high school record in the 5000 meters run indoors, running 16:19.69 to win the New Balance Indoor nationals in New York's Fort Washington Avenue Armory in March 2012 before Mary Cain set a new record in 2013.

NCAA
Erin Finn is a 9-time NCAA Division I All-American and 10-time Big Ten champion (4 outdoor). She placed sixth in 10,000 meters in a time of 32:50.14 at 2014 NCAA Division I Outdoor Track and Field Championships. Finn placed fifth in 5000 meters in 15:43.97 at 2015 NCAA Division I Outdoor Track and Field Championships. Finn placed 12th in 10,000 m at 2019 NCAA Division I Outdoor Track and Field Championships in 33:40.88.

International
Finn placed 8th in Beach to Beacon 10K in 33:16 August 5, 2017 in Cape Elizabeth, Maine. Finn won Big Ten Network 5k in 16:8 July 23, 2017 in Chicago, Illinois.

Finn placed 10th in mile in 4:26 at Kalakaua Merrie Mile in Honolulu, Hawai'i on December 10, 2016.

Finn won gold at 2014 NACAC Under-23 Championships in Athletics in 16:06.26 setting a championship record.

She competed in the 2013 IAAF World Cross Country Championships – Junior women's race placing 34th in 20:03 in 6 km in Bydgoszcz. Erin Finn won 2013 NACAC Cross Country Championships Junior Women race in 14:09 over the 4 km course in Mandeville, Jamaica, as Team USA finished second to Canada.

References

External links
 Erin Finn at the University of Michigan
 
 
 

1994 births
Living people
American female long-distance runners
American female middle-distance runners
Sportspeople from Oakland County, Michigan
Track and field athletes from Michigan
People from West Bloomfield, Michigan
Michigan Wolverines women's track and field athletes
21st-century American women